Jaba Dimtu is a settlement in Kenya's Mandera County.

References 

Populated places in North Eastern Province (Kenya)
Mandera County